Godfather of Punk can refer to:

*Captain Beefheart (1941-2010) 
Iggy Pop (born 1947), of The Stooges
Joey Ramone (1951-2001), of The Ramones
Lou Reed (1942-2013), of The Velvet Underground
Pete Townshend (born 1945), of The Who
John Lydon (born 1956) of The Sex Pistols and Public Image Limited (PIL)

See also

Honorific nicknames in popular music